Ivan Atanasov (born April 30, 1956) is a former Bulgarian ice hockey player. He played for the Bulgaria men's national ice hockey team at the 1976 Winter Olympics in Innsbruck.

His older brother, Malin Atanasov, also played for the Bulgarian national ice hockey team at the 1976 Winter Olympics.

References

1956 births
Living people
Bulgarian ice hockey forwards
Ice hockey players at the 1976 Winter Olympics
Olympic ice hockey players of Bulgaria